Suliman Sofyani (born 2 February 1991) is a Saudi Arabian professional footballer who plays for Al-Nahda as a goalkeeper .

Career
Sofyani began his career at youth Al-Shabab . left Al-Shabab and signed with Al-Kawkab on July 3, 2013 . left Al-Kawkab and signed with Al-Mujazzal on May 30, 2014 . left Al-Mujazzal and signed with Al-Faisaly on June 8, 2015 . left Al-Faisaly and signed with Al-Nojoom on July 16, 2017 . left Al-Nojoom and signed with Al-Mujazzal on July 16, 2018 . left Al-Mujazzal and signed with Al-Shoulla on January 22, 2019. left Al-Shoulla and signed with Al-Mujazzal on July 25, 2019. left Al-Mujazzal and signed with Al-Nojoom on January 19, 2020. left Al-Nojoom and signed with Al-Sahel on October 20, 2020. On 28 July 2022, Sofyani joined Al-Nahda.

References

External links 
 

1991 births
Living people
Saudi Arabian footballers
Saudi Arabia youth international footballers
Al-Shabab FC (Riyadh) players
Al-Kawkab FC players
Al-Mujazzal Club players
Al-Faisaly FC players
Al-Nojoom FC players
Al-Shoulla FC players
Al-Sahel SC (Saudi Arabia) players
Wej SC players
Al-Nahda Club (Saudi Arabia) players
Saudi Professional League players
Saudi First Division League players
Saudi Second Division players
Association football goalkeepers